Murray French is a former Australian racing cyclist. He finished in second place in the Australian National Road Race Championships in 1955.

References

External links

Year of birth missing (living people)
Living people
Australian male cyclists
Place of birth missing (living people)